John Jeremy Doyle,  (born 4 January 1945), Australian jurist, was the Chief Justice of the Supreme Court of South Australia, the highest ranking court in the Australian State of South Australia, between 1995 and 2012.

Early life and education
Doyle was educated at Saint Ignatius College, South Australia, and was dux of the college in 1962. He went on to graduate in law from the University of Adelaide in 1966 and was awarded a Rhodes Scholarship in 1967, completing his studies in law at Magdalen College, Oxford, in 1969.

Career
In the following year he was admitted to the bar in South Australia.

Before being elevated to the position of chief justice in 1995, Doyle served as the Solicitor-General of South Australia from 1986 to 1995, where he was highly regarded for his skills as an advocate, particularly in complex constitutional cases. On a number of occasions, most recently in 1998, speculation surfaced that he may become the first South Australian to be appointed to the High Court of Australia; however, an appointment never eventuated.  He was a founding member of Hanson Chambers and, immediately prior to his move to the independent bar, was a partner at Adelaide law firm, Kelly & Co. 

Doyle is a fervent supporter of the Norwood Football Club in the South Australian National Football League.

During his time as Chief Justice, Doyle was appointed as an Acting Judge of the Supreme Court of the Northern Territory in 2000 to hear an appeal concerning the appointment of the then Northern Territory Chief Magistrate Hugh Bradley.

On 30 April 2012, Doyle announced his retirement as Chief Justice, which took effect on 22 June 2012. He was succeeded as Chief Justice by Chris Kourakis.

See also
 Judiciary of Australia

References

External links
 National Library of Australia Photograph

1945 births
Living people
Alumni of Magdalen College, Oxford
Australian Rhodes Scholars
Australian King's Counsel
Chief Justices of South Australia
Judges of the Supreme Court of South Australia
Judges of the Supreme Court of the Northern Territory
Companions of the Order of Australia
Adelaide Law School alumni
Solicitors-General of South Australia
20th-century Australian judges
21st-century Australian judges